Nobody's Baby is a 2001 comedy film written and directed by David Seltzer and starring Gary Oldman and Skeet Ulrich.

Plot
In this comedy, Billy Raedeen (Skeet Ulrich) escapes the law after being convicted with his partner in crime Buford Bill (Gary Oldman). On his way to Utah, Billy rescues a baby from an auto wreck and decides to keep it though he knows next to nothing about caring for an infant. He gets help from diner waitress Shauna Louise (Radha Mitchell) and her neighbor Estelle (Mary Steenburgen). When Buford tracks Billy down, he sees the baby as a monetary  potential. However, Billy and Shauna Louise have grown attached to the child and they are not willing to give her up.

Cast

Release
Following its premiere at the 2001 Sundance Film Festival, the film was not released theatrically.  It received a USA home video release on August 20, 2002.

Reception
Geoffrey Gilmore, director of the Sundance Film Festival, called the film "a pure delight from start to finish":
If you were impressed watching Oldman play a congressman, wait until you see him do comedy and line dance! With terrific turns by Mary Steenburgen and Radha Mitchell, Utah scenery, hilarious dialogue, and the best joke in a film this side of Something about Mary, Nobody's Baby is a wonderfully entertaining odyssey that should bring Seltzer nothing but accolades.

Variety, reviewing the film after its January 21, 2001 premiere at Sundance, described it as "aim[ing] somewhere between Dumb and Dumber and Three Men and a Baby.  The film's "witless script wrings few laughs from its retread conceits...What's most toxic, however, is having to watch these actors sweat for their paychecks. Oldman vanishes into mutton chops and Walter Brennan mannerisms, gamely making an idiot of himself, to absolutely no humorous result....Steenburgen, Greene and O'Neill are allowed to be little more than unpleasant; Matthew Modine surfaces in a nothing role.  Twinkling amidst the cow pies, Ulrich clearly relishes playing dum-dum, and his disarming sweetness lends the film whatever fleeting conviction it can claim."

Review aggregator Rotten Tomatoes records a 0% approval rating and a 3.95/10 average score, based on six reviews.

References

External links

2001 films
2001 comedy films
American comedy films
Artisan Entertainment films
Films directed by David Seltzer
2000s English-language films
Films produced by Boaz Davidson
2000s American films